Kwesi Akomia Kyeremateng was a member of the Ghanaian parliament who represented Afigya-Sekyere East in the Ashanti Region of Ghana from the 1996 general election to the 2008 general election. He is a member of the New Patriotic Party who represented the 2nd, 3rd and 4th Parliament.

Politics 
Akomia was first elected into Parliament during the December 1996 Ghanaian General Elections on the Ticket of the New Patriotic Party  representing the Afigya-Sekyere East  Constituency in the Ashanti Region of Ghana. He polled 18,500 votes out of the 29,734 valid votes cast representing 46.30% against Pious Mercilus G. Griffiths an National Democratic Congress (NDC) member who polled 11,234 votes. He was re-elected into Parliament in 2000 with 26,162 votes out of the 36,276 valid votes cast representing 71.70% against Edward O. Aboagye an NDC member who polled 8,935 representing 24.50%, Dorothy Gifty Antwi a Convention People's Party (CPP) member who polled 451 votes representing 1.20%, Ernest A. Boadu a NRP member who polled 421 votes representing 1.20%, Emmanuel A. Gyasi a UGM member who polled 307 votes representing 0.80% and Kwakwa Amoah a PNC member who polled 213 votes representing 0.60%

Sources

Living people
Ghanaian MPs 2001–2005
21st-century Ghanaian politicians
New Patriotic Party politicians
People from Ashanti Region
Ghanaian MPs 1997–2001
Year of birth missing (living people)
Ghanaian MPs 2005–2009